Alpha-toxin may refer to:
Staphylococcus aureus alpha toxin, a toxin
Lecithinase C, an enzyme